The 26th South American U18 Championships in Athletics were held in São Paulo, Brazil, on 9, 10 and 11 September 2022.

Medal summary

Boys

Girls

Mixed

Medal table

References

South American U18 Championships in Athletics
South American U18 Championships in Athletics
South American U18 Championships in Athletics
South American U18 Championships in Athletics
International athletics competitions hosted by Brazil
International sports competitions in São Paulo
South American U18 Championships in Athletics